The two-man bobsleigh competition at the 2018 Winter Olympics was held on 18 and 19 February at the Alpensia Sliding Centre near Pyeongchang, South Korea. Justin Kripps and Alexander Kopacz of Canada and Francesco Friedrich and Thorsten Margis of Germany shared gold after the two teams recorded exactly the same time after four runs. Oskars Melbārdis and Jānis Strenga of Latvia won the bronze medal.

Qualification

The top three countries in the 2017–18 Bobsleigh season (including the World Cup, Europe races and Americas Cup) were awarded the maximum three sleds. The next six countries were awarded two sleds each. The remaining nine sleds were awarded to nine different countries, with South Korea being awarded a slot as host nation.

Results
The first two runs were held on 18 February and the last two runs were held on 19 February.

References

Bobsleigh at the 2018 Winter Olympics
Men's bobsleigh at the 2018 Winter Olympics
Men's events at the 2018 Winter Olympics